Realized eschatology is a Christian eschatological theory popularized by J.A.T. Robinson, Joachim Jeremias, Ethelbert Stauffer (1902- 1979), and 
C. H. Dodd (1884–1973) that holds that the eschatological passages in the New Testament do not refer to the future, but instead refer to the ministry of Jesus and his lasting legacy. Eschatology is therefore not the end of the world but its rebirth instituted by Jesus and continued by his disciples, a historical (rather than transhistorical) phenomenon. Those holding this view generally dismiss eschatology theories, believing them to be irrelevant; they hold that what Jesus said and did, and told his disciples to do likewise, are of greater significance than any messianic expectations. Realized eschatology is contrasted with consistent eschatology. The two concepts have been combined in inaugurated eschatology.

Criticism 
Theologian John Walvoord asserts that this view is attractive to liberal Christians who prefer to emphasize the love and goodness of God while rejecting the notion of judgment. Instead, theology professor David Wheeler suggests that eschatology should be about being engaged in the process of becoming, rather than waiting for external and unknown forces to bring about destruction.

See also
Christian perfection
Idealism (Christian eschatology)
Immanentize the eschaton
Jesuism
Postmillennialism
Preterism
Tikkun olam
World to Come
Consistent eschatology
Christian eschatology
Idealism (Christian eschatology)
Kingdom theology
Inaugurated eschatology

References and notes

Christian eschatology
Christian terminology